Hello Kitty: Big City Dreams is a Hello Kitty game published by Empire Interactive for the Nintendo DS.
Hello Kitty: Big City Dreams offers two complementary styles of play: exploration and mini-game. Exploration mode offers the chance to take control of Hello Kitty and explore a 3D city, complete with streets, buildings, shops, neighborhood characters, and public transportation that Hello Kitty can ride. Different locations within the city will trigger a variety of mini-games for Hello Kitty to play. Completing these mini-games will earn friendship points which Hello Kitty can then use to ride the bus or train, purchase new outfits and items, decorate and customize her apartment, and progress in her journey. In order to keep her friends happy, Hello Kitty will have to stay in touch by checking her mail frequently.

References

External links
GameSpot Summary
Hello Kitty: Big City Dreams Website

2008 video games
Exploration video games
Big City Dreams
Nintendo DS games
Nintendo DS-only games
Video games developed in Hungary
Empire Interactive games